Kitabu is an EPUB reading application for macOS, released in 2012.

Features 

 Library management
 Table of Contents
 Additional options: Text Size, Color
 Mouse & Trackpad gestures support
 Multiselection in Library view
 E-book library in two views
 Book pane selection. Book can be displayed in one, two, or three panes
 Font and background selection
 Fixed Layout
 Quick Look plugin that previews ePub file metadata directly from the Finder

References 

 2012 "Teaching with IPads/IPods: Teaching Resources"
 2012 "Kitabu: An Alternative to Kindle for mac?"
 2012 "Macwelt review - ePub-Books lesen mit Kitabu 1.0.2"
 2013 "The Best Apps to Read eBooks on Your Mac"

External links 

 

EPUB readers